John Files Tom, Texas Revolutionary War Veteran, Sheriff of Guadalupe County, Texas, Texas Ranger Captain during the Civil War and a Representative in the 13th Texas State Legislature, was born on April 22, 1818, in Cathey's Creek in Maury County, Tennessee to William Tom (1792-1871) and Mary Susan Files Tom (1792-1830).

Early life 
The Tom Family moved to Texas from Tennessee in 1835 and settled at Washington-on-the-Brazos. William Tom brought a letter of good character signed by 36 people from Tennessee, which was double certified by the Maury County Clerk and the Governor of Tennessee.

Texas Revolution 
In 1835, when Captain Phillip Coe's Texas Ranger company under the command of Col. John Henry Moore was called to help with the Battle of Gonzales Private William Tom stayed home to protect the women, children and livestock from potential Indian attacks. When the time came to join Stephen F. Austin's volunteer army John Files Tom wanted to join his father and go to battle, but his stepmother, Kessiah Hines Tom wanted him to have something to wear for his feet, so John Files Tom made himself moccasins and a young neighbor girl having heard of the predicament brought her stockings for John Files Tom to wear with his newly fashioned moccasins so that he could go to battle with his father. Both John Files Tom and his father joined General Stephen F. Austin's army on the way to San Antonio and they participated in the battle of Concepción and the Grass Fight. During the siege of Bexar John Files Tom was a gunner boy with Col. James C. Neill's artillery, which was firing diversion shots at the Alamo, while his father William Tom was fighting with Ben Milam. The Toms stayed in San Antonio until February 11, 1836, when they left to assist with the evacuations of civilians known as the Runaway Scrape. In March 1836 John Files Tom left his father, William Tom, and joined General Sam Houston's army on the Colorado River and was placed in Captain W. W. Hill's company. The Battle of San Jacinto occurred on April 21, 1836, which was the day before John Files Tom's eighteenth birthday. John Files Tom was part of the charge yelling "Remember the Alamo" and "Remember Goliad", but he was hit in the knee cap by a large musket ball and fell out of line and into a hog wallow. The battle lasted a mere eighteen minutes, but the killing of Mexican soldiers continued through the night. Milt Swisher and Louis Clemens had noted where John Files Tom fell and they eventually came back for him and carried him to the home of Lorenzo de Zavala, where John Files Tom recovered from his injury. General Sam Houston was also injured during the battle and was taken to New Orleans, Louisiana for treatment. While General Houston was in New Orleans, he had the official reports from the battle published into a pamphlet by the Bulletin newspaper office, however they made a mistake and listed John Files Tom as killed in battle. After a few weeks of recovery, John Files Tom rode his horse home to reunite with his family.

Sheriff in Guadalupe County 
In 1839, before leaving Washington County, Texas John Files Tom met Mary Ann Moffitt, a schoolteacher from Pennsylvania, who came to Texas to improve her health. While trying to get a closer look at the beautiful young school teacher while still on horseback outside the horse was spooked and ran inside the school and disrupted the class. The couple were married on July 2, 1840. The Tom family moved to Seguin, Texas before Guadalupe County was formed in 1846. John Files Tom's father William Tom was elected as one of the first County Commissioners and he presided over the first meeting of the Guadalupe County Commissioners Court. John Files Tom was elected as Sheriff of Guadalupe County on August 4, 1856, and re-elected on August 2, 1858, and served until August 6, 1860. There was a two term limit on Sheriffs at that time. While in Guadalupe County John Files Tom had a cattle ranch where he employed James Henry East, who went on to be part of Sheriff Pat Garrett's pose that captured Billy the Kid.

Frontier Defense in Atascosa County 
John Files Tom began his experience as a Texas Ranger in 1861 as a private in Captain Claiborne Rector's company. In 1864, John Files Tom was commissioned to organize his own company of Texas Rangers for Frontier Defense during the Civil War. Captain Tom came from a family full of Texas Rangers including his father William Tom, his brothers William Jr, Alfred, Houston, and George W Tom, his cousin Hugh Simpson Tom, brother-in-laws Jordan Alexander Irvin, John Gladden King Jr and Riley Lewis and son-in-laws Edward Campbell, William Green Winsett, and Charles Harrison Long. Captain Tom's granddaughter married famed lawman Dudley Snyder Barker, who wrote the recommendation for Frank Hamer to become a Texas Ranger.  John Horton Slaughter joined Captain John Files Tom's company to fight Comanches, before eventually moving to Tombstone, Arizona and getting elected in 1886 as Cochise County Sheriff, he was also the inspiration for Walt Disney's 1950's television series "Texas John Slaughter". John Files Tom's father William Tom died February 15, 1871, his remains were buried on family land in Guadalupe County, but were later reinterred at the Texas State Cemetery. After the Civil War Captain John Files Tom joined Captain Leander H. McNelly of the Texas State Police (Texas Rangers) on the Rio Grande Expedition in 1872. Mary Ann (Moffitt) Tom became ill while visiting her daughter Sarah Caroline (Tom) Winsett and died on June 23, 1873, in the Old Rock Church community in Atascosa County. Marry Ann Tom died at age 53 after giving birth to and raising Mary Jane (Tom) Campbell, Charles Alfred Tom, Sarah Caroline (Tom) Winsett, Harrietta Louisa (Tom) Long and Emily Catherine (Tom) Dewees. John Files Tom was elected to the Texas House of Representatives in the 13th Texas State Legislature serving in the position for District 30 from January 14, 1873, to January 13, 1874. The 13th Texas State Legislature were known as the "Liberators of Texas" because they ended reconstruction in Texas. John Files Tom took part in the Coke-Davis Controversy where the upper floor of the Capitol building was held until Governor Davis accepted the election results and left office. It was not long after the death of Mary Ann Tom that John Files Tom began looking for a new wife, and on December 17, 1873, he was married to Nancy Henderson. John Files Tom and Nancy (Henderson) Tom had nine children together including William Winsett Tom, Ida Jane (Tom) Howell, Julia Anne (Tom) Godbold, John F. Tom, William Burgess Tom, John Ireland Tom, Myrtle Ola (Tom) Orrell, and Jessie Lavesta (Tom) Bonner Godbold.

Death in Leakey 
John Files and Nancy Tom moved to Leakey, Texas along the Frio River in 1890 before Real County was formed. In 1893 Captain Tom broke his leg while attempting to dismount from his horse, this injury coupled with his injury from the Battle of San Jacinto caused him to use crutches. Captain John Files Tom had been made a Mason in 1867, and was raised in 1871 at Pleasanton Lodge No. 283 then he was later active at Jeptha Lodge No. 469 where Captain Tom served as Treasurer in 1877 and again from 1880 to 1881, finally Captain Tom affiliated with Leakey Lodge No. 622 in 1891 and was an active member until his death. At age 87, Captain John Files Tom died on March 26, 1906, at his ranch home in Leakey, Bandera County, Texas and was buried in Leakey Floral Cemetery.

References 

1818 births
1906 deaths
Members of the Texas Ranger Division
Members of the Texas Legislature
People from Maury County, Tennessee
Tom